Aminath Ameela (born 12 December 1985) is a Maldivian film actress.

Career
Ameela made her career debut with the erotic short film Kiss Jazbaath alongside Ali Seezan and Khadheeja Ibrahim Didi. The film was subject to several criticism for its bold display of erotic scenes. This was followed by several other short films including, Dr. Rocky (2007), Hiyy Ekaniveemaa (2007) and Handi Kujjaa (2007); where none of them helped her to receive the critical and commercial recognition.

In 2008, she appeared in a small role in Fathimath Nahula's romantic drama film, Yoosuf which depicts the story of a deaf and mute man (played by Yoosuf Shafeeu) who has been mistreated by a wealthy family, mocking his disability. Featuring an ensemble cast including Yoosuf Shafeeu, Niuma Mohamed, Sheela Najeeb, Ahmed Nimal, Fauziyya Hassan, Ravee Farooq, Zeenath Abbas and Ahmed Lais Asim, the film received widespread critical acclaim and attained blockbuster status at box office. The same year she featured in the short films, including the erotic thriller Guest House Room Number:201, comedy films No Money Full Beggy, Dhanthura and romantic films Umurah Salaam, Kushakaanulaa 1 and Maafukuraashey Kalaa. Apart from that, she also starred as Zeena, an unfortunate wife who loses her husband in a road accident, in Yoosuf Shafeeu and Fathimath Nahula's critically and commercially successful television series Soora.

The following year, she had only one release, a comedy short film, Dheulhi Ehnuvi Dhiulhi (2009). Ali Seezan's family drama Maafeh Neiy was released in 2010, where she appeared alongside Ali Seezan and Niuma Mohamed, where she played the role Rizna, a cruel daughter who mistreats her own mother. The film highlighting many social issues including human rights abuses, forced marriage and domestic violence was criticised for its melodrama. After two years, she starred in Ahmed Nimal's television mini-series Dhirumeh Nethas as a helpful friend followed by a supporting role in another drama series Vaudhey Mee (2012).

Personal life
During her peak days in her career, Ameela married her co-star Ahmed Latheef, but the couple got divorced in 2011. On 5 July 2013, she married an army officer.

Filmography

Feature film

Short film

Television

References 

Living people
People from Malé
21st-century Maldivian actresses
Maldivian film actresses
1985 births
United Arab Emirates Health Foundation Prize laureates